Nipah virus is a bat-borne virus that causes Nipah virus infection in humans and other animals, a disease with a high mortality rate. Numerous disease outbreaks caused by Nipah virus have occurred in South and Southeast Asia. Nipah virus belongs to the genus Henipavirus along with the Hendra virus, which has also caused disease outbreaks.

Virology
Like other henipaviruses, the Nipah virus genome is a single (nonsegmented) negative-sense, single-stranded RNA of over 18 kb, which is substantially longer than that of other paramyxoviruses. The enveloped virus particles are variable in shape, and can be filamentous or spherical; they contain a helical nucleocapsid. Six structural proteins are generated: N (nucleocapsid), P (phosphoprotein), M (matrix), F (fusion), G (glycoprotein) and L (RNA polymerase). The P open reading frame also encodes three nonstructural proteins, C, V and W. 

There are two envelope glycoproteins. The G glycoprotein ectodomain assembles as a homotetramer to form the viral anti-receptor or attachment protein, which binds to the receptor on the host cell. Each strand in the ectodomain consists of four distinct regions: at the N-terminal and connecting to the viral surface is the helical stalk, followed by the beta-sandwich neck domain, the linker region and finally, at the C-terminal, four heads which contain host cell receptor binding domains.  Each head consists of a beta-propellor structure with six blades. There are three unique folding patterns of the heads, resulting in a 2-up/2-down configuration where two heads are positioned distal to the virus and two heads are proximal. Due to the folding patterns and subsequent arrangement of the heads, only one of the four heads is positioned with its binding site accessible to associate with the host B2/B3 receptor. The G protein head domain is also highly antigenic, inducing head-specific antibodies in primate models. As such, it is a prime target for vaccine development as well as antibody therapy. One head-specific antibody, m102.4, has been used in compassionate use cases and has completed Phase 1 clinical trials.  The F glycoprotein forms a trimer, which mediates membrane fusion.

Tropism
Ephrins B2 and B3 have been identified as the main receptors for Nipah virus. Ephrin subtypes have a complex distribution of expression throughout the body, where the B3 is noted to have particularly high expression in some forebrain subregions.

Evolution
The most likely origin of this virus was in 1947 (95% credible interval: 1888–1988). There are two clades of this virus—one with its origin in 1995 (95% credible interval: 1985–2002) and a second with its origin in 1985 (95% credible interval: 1971–1996). The mutation rate was estimated to be 6.5 × 10−4 substitution/site/year (95% credible interval: 2.3 × 10−4 –1.18 × 10−3), similar to other RNA viruses.

Geographic distribution

Nipah virus has been isolated from Lyle's flying fox (Pteropus lylei) in Cambodia and viral RNA found in urine and saliva from P. lylei and Horsfield's roundleaf bat (Hipposideros larvatus) in Thailand. Infective virus has also been isolated from environmental samples of bat urine and partially eaten fruit in Malaysia. Antibodies to henipaviruses have also been found in fruit bats in Madagascar (Pteropus rufus, Eidolon dupreanum) and Ghana (Eidolon helvum) indicating a wide geographic distribution of the viruses. No infection of humans or other species have been observed in Cambodia, Thailand or Africa as of May 2018.

Symptoms
 Fever
 Headache
 Muscle pain (myalgia)
 Vomiting
 Sore throat

These symptoms can be followed by more serious conditions including:
 Dizziness
 Drowsiness
 Altered consciousness
 Acute encephalitis
 Atypical pneumonia
 Severe respiratory distress
 Seizures

History

Emergence
The first cases of Nipah virus infection were identified in 1998, when an outbreak of neurological and respiratory disease on pig farms in peninsular Malaysia caused 265 human cases, with 108 deaths. The virus itself was isolated the following year in 1999. This outbreak resulted in the culling of one million pigs. In Singapore, 11 cases, including one death, occurred in abattoir workers exposed to pigs imported from the affected Malaysian farms. The Nipah virus has been classified by the Centers for Disease Control and Prevention as a Category C agent. The name "Nipah" refers to the place, Sungai Nipah (literally 'nipah river') in Port Dickson, Negeri Sembilan, the source of the human case from which Nipah virus was first isolated. Nipah virus is one of several viruses identified by WHO as a likely cause of a future epidemic in a new plan developed after the Ebola epidemic for urgent research and development before and during an epidemic toward new diagnostic tests, vaccines and medicines.

The outbreak was originally mistaken for Japanese encephalitis, but physicians in the area noted that persons who had been vaccinated against Japanese encephalitis were not protected in the epidemic, and the number of cases among adults was unusual. Although these observations were recorded in the first month of the outbreak, the Ministry of Health failed to take them into account, and launched a nationwide campaign to educate people on the dangers of Japanese encephalitis and its vector, Culex mosquitoes.

Symptoms of infection from the Malaysian outbreak were primarily encephalitic in humans and respiratory in pigs. Later outbreaks have caused respiratory illness in humans, increasing the likelihood of human-to-human transmission and indicating the existence of more dangerous strains of the virus.

Based on seroprevalence data and virus isolations, the primary reservoir for Nipah virus was identified as Pteropid fruit bats, including Pteropus vampyrus (large flying fox), and Pteropus hypomelanus (small flying fox), both found in Malaysia.

The transmission of Nipah virus from flying foxes to pigs is thought to be due to an increasing overlap between bat habitats and piggeries in peninsular Malaysia. At the index farm, fruit orchards were in close proximity to the piggery, allowing the spillage of urine, faeces and partially eaten fruit onto the pigs. Retrospective studies demonstrate that viral spillover into pigs may have been occurring, undetected, in Malaysia since 1996. During 1998, viral spread was aided by the transfer of infected pigs to other farms, where new outbreaks occurred.

Outbreaks of disease

Nipah virus infection outbreaks have been reported in Malaysia, Singapore, Bangladesh and India. The highest mortality due to Nipah virus infection has occurred in Bangladesh, where outbreaks are typically seen in winter. Nipah virus first appeared in 1998, in peninsular Malaysia in pigs and pig farmers. By mid-1999, more than 265 human cases of encephalitis, including 105 deaths, had been reported in Malaysia, and 11 cases of either encephalitis or respiratory illness with one fatality were reported in Singapore. In 2001, Nipah virus was reported from Meherpur District, Bangladesh and Siliguri, India. The outbreak again appeared in 2003, 2004 and 2005 in Naogaon District, Manikganj District, Rajbari District, Faridpur District and Tangail District. In Bangladesh there were also outbreaks in subsequent years. In September 2021, Nipah virus resurfaced in Kerala, India claiming the life of a 12 year old boy.

See also

 1998–1999 Malaysia Nipah virus outbreak
 2018 Nipah virus outbreak in Kerala
 2021 Nipah virus outbreak in Kerala

References

External links
 
 
 

Animal virology
Henipavirus
Viral diseases
Zoonoses